Gertrude Kahn, also known as Mrs. Ray Kahn, was an American who allegedly had a covert relationship with Soviet intelligence during World War II.  In a Venona transcript from Moscow, the Moscow Center suggested that Mrs. Kahn had been used for foreign intelligence work.  The New York Rezidentura responded that it may not be wise, and that she was best suited for a "passive" role.  Kahn's code name in Soviet intelligence and in the Venona decrypts is "Dinah."

Venona
Mrs. Ray (Gertrude) Kahn is referenced in the following Venona project decryptions:

1000 KGB New York to Moscow, 24 June 1943; 
1136 KGB New York to Moscow, 13 July 1943; 
1205 KGB New York to Moscow, 22 July 1943.

References
 John Earl Haynes and Harvey Klehr, Venona: Decoding Soviet Espionage in America, Yale University Press (1999), pgs. 353, 454.

American spies for the Soviet Union
American people in the Venona papers
Possibly living people
Year of birth missing (living people)